Bloodmatch is a 1991 martial-arts film directed by Albert Pyun and starring Thom Mathews, Hope Marie Carlton, Marianne Taylor, Vincent Klyn, Michel Qissi, and Benny "The Jet" Urquidez.

Plot
The film opens with a man chasing another man. The chaser is Brick Bardo, who is investigating the death of his brother. He catches up to Davey, who attempts to fight him, resulting in Davey getting knocked out and being tied up to the ground in the boiling Sun. Brick interrogates Davey through torturous methods and tells him that Brick's brother was involved in a fixed kickboxing fight scheme, which resulted in his exile and eventual murder. Brick demands the name of the four people who are responsible for his brother's death. Davey names Brent Caldwell, Mike Johnson, Billy Munoz, and Connie Angel.

Brick has a partner in Max, a woman who seduces Brent, now a middleweight champion, and after a session of lovemaking, knocks him out with ether. Brick calls Billy, a former kickboxing legend who is now working as a janitor. Brick tells Billy he has kidnapped his daughter to meet him in Las Vegas if he wants to see his daughter again. Mike, a former heavyweight champion, is on the run from three hoodlums. Mike attempts to fight them off unsuccessfully, after which Max arrives and rescues Mike from the thugs and offers to take him to Las Vegas. Connie is a successful businesswoman for the World Martial Arts Council who has been seeing another man behind her estranged husband's back and is only looking to get away from the council as a rich woman after the impending divorce. Brick shows up and beats up Connie's lover and confronts her. She attempts to fight him but fails with Brick knocking her out.

At an abandoned arena in Las Vegas, Brent, Billy, Mike, and Connie are all tied up in front of a ring. Max wakes up the four and all four are shocked to learn about each other. They wonder why they are tied up and attempt to get loose. Connie remembers Wood Wilson, an old boyfriend who she defeated in a male vs female kickboxing match, and who is revealed to be Brick's brother. The four were asked to testify against Wood for fight fixing but their testimonies were later cancelled, with Brent vehemently denying that he was ever involved in anything involving Wood. Brick enters the ring and lets them in on what is happening. A recorded conversation reveals that Jack, a sports commissioner, was involved in fight fixing. Brick says that he killed Jack and makes a comment about Jack's partner Sam having a friend who set up Wood Wilson, leading to Wood's death. Brick intends to use the ring as his interrogation place, fighting each of the four until he gets answers.

Mike is the first one to face Brick's interrogation. Brick makes the stipulations. If Mike wins, everyone goes free, but if Brick wins, Mike dies and the rest will continue to be interrogated. Mike attempts to fight hard, but Brick fights harder, and just when Mike is about to die, Billy stops him and offers to talk. Billy heads to the ring and demands to see his daughter. Brick tells Billy that his daughter has died. In a rage, Billy begins to fight Brick. At first getting the upper hand, Billy lets his emotions get the best of him. Brick tells Billy if he tells him who set Wood up, he will spare his son's life. Billy says he only received a letter but no name and Brick promises to kill Billy's son. Brick proceeds to break Billy's back, killing him.

Brent is third in line for interrogation. As he makes his way to the ring, he attempts to pull a knife on Max, but has the gun pointed to him again. Brent enters the ring and Brick begins his interrogation, accusing Brent as the fight fixer. Brent once again denies it and promises not to say anything. Connie, still tied up, deciphers that Brent is the one who killed Wood Wilson. As Brick fights Brent, a barely breathing Mike crawls towards Connie and hands her the knife Brent had earlier. In the ring, an enraged Brick tells Brent, who is begging for his life, that Wood didn't beg for his life. When Brent asks how he knew, Brick reveals that he was there as well and kills Brent.

When Max goes to retrieve Connie, Connie frees herself and throws the knife at Max, killing her. Brick finally reveals to Connie the whole truth. Brick is actually Wood Wilson. Connie doesn't believe it, but Brick confesses it all. He survived being viciously beaten by Brent five years ago and had his face changed through plastic surgery. Connie admits she was the mastermind behind the scheme in order to make enough money so she and Wood could escape together, but Wood didn't want to participate in her plan. Connie admits she was wrong for choosing money over her love for Wood. Brick/Wood tells Connie they have to fight and admits he hadn't really killed Billy's daughter, but has her hidden. If Connie wins, he will release Billy's daughter. Brick and Connie fight with Connie getting the upper hand and finally defeating Brick/Wood once again after Brick attempts to rape her. A kick to the chest on a downed Brick kills him.

The next day, Connie is sitting in her office, awaiting to meet Billy's kids.

Cast
 Thom Mathews as "Brick" Bardo  
 Hope Marie Carlton as Connie Angel 
 Marianne Taylor as Max Manduke 
 Benny "The Jet" Urquidez as Billy Munoz  
 Dale Jacoby as Brent Caldwell  
 Thunder Wolf as Mike Johnson  
 Jason Brooks as Steve Buscomo  
 Hector Peña as Sam Gitty  
 Peter Cunningham as Dwayne Ryan  
 Patrick Outlaw Buckley as Walker Stevens  
 Vincent Klyn as Carl Cuba  
 Michel Qissi as Davey O'Brien  
 Christian Andrews as Jack Kelly

Reception 
Bloodmatch received almost universally negative reviews. TV Guide gave it just one star out of five in a review that stated: "Spattered blood, broken bones, bodies on the canvas ... The violence, without clear motive, is foolish, pointless and, by some standards, grotesque." MonsterHunter described the movie as being "borderline compelling in a minor trainwreck sort of way" and "nothing more than a curiosity that’s unsuccessful at whatever it was trying to accomplish". ComeuppanceReviews called it "dour, dry, dark and overlong at 85 minutes".

References

External links
 
 

1991 action films
1991 films
American martial arts films
1991 martial arts films
Martial arts tournament films
1990s English-language films
1990s American films